Nicolás Varrone (born 6 November 2000) is an Argentine racing driver.

Career 
Varrone won of V de V Challenge Monoplace in 2018, and finished third in the LMP3 class of the Michelin Le Mans Cup in 2021.

In 2022, Varrone made his debut at the IMSA SportsCar Championship where he entered the Six Hours of The Glen in the LMP3 category. He then signed with the Canadian racing team AWA for the 2023 season.

In January 2023, Varrone signed for Corvette Racing to contest the LMGTE Am class of the 2023 FIA World Endurance Championship, driving a Chevrolet Corvette C8.R.

Racing record

Career summary

† As he was a guest driver, Varrone was ineligible to score points.

Complete 24 Hours of Le Mans results

Complete European Le Mans Series results

Complete FIA World Endurance Championship results
(key) (Races in bold indicate pole position; races in italics indicate fastest lap)

Complete WeatherTech SportsCar Championship results
(key) (Races in bold indicate pole position; results in italics indicate fastest lap)

References

External links

2000 births
Living people
People from Escobar Partido
Sportspeople from Buenos Aires Province
Argentine racing drivers
24 Hours of Le Mans drivers
FIA World Endurance Championship drivers
Formula Renault Argentina drivers
International GT Open drivers
European Le Mans Series drivers
Asian Le Mans Series drivers
WeatherTech SportsCar Championship drivers
Iron Lynx drivers
Corvette Racing drivers
TC 2000 Championship drivers
BRDC British Formula 3 Championship drivers
Le Mans Cup drivers
24H Series drivers
Team Lazarus drivers
Chris Dittmann Racing drivers